Giuseppe Carletti (born 22 July 1959) is a former Italian World Cup alpine ski racer.

World Championships results

References

External links
 

1961 births
Living people
Italian male alpine skiers